Mangarrayi (Manggarrai, Mungerry, Ngarrabadji) is an Australian language spoken in the Northern Territory. Its classification is uncertain. Margaret Sharpe originally sought to record the language but turned to the study of Alawa after the station owner where her informants lived denied her access, having tired of the presence of researchers on the property.

Speakers 
The 2016 Australian Bureau of Statistics official census indicates that there are no speakers of Mangarrayi remaining, however elders Sheila Conway and Jessie Roberts are both speakers of Mangarrayi. Conway continues to make an important contribution to language revitalization projects in the Jilkminggan community.

Numeric system
Mangarrayi has a number system that extends only to three.

Vocabulary
Capell (1940) lists the following basic vocabulary items for Mungarai (Mangarayi):

{| class="wikitable sortable"
! gloss
! Mungarai
|-
| man
| malaṉ
|-
| woman
| gaɖugu
|-
| head
| gaia
|-
| eye
| djib
|-
| nose
| miliŋ
|-
| mouth
| djäɽäb
|-
| tongue
| djawi
|-
| stomach
| daɽa
|-
| bone
| dama
|-
| blood
| guranjin
|-
| kangaroo
| garawi
|-
| opossum
| widjwidj
|-
| crow
| wagwag
|-
| fly
| mɔːdj
|-
| sun
| ganjwar
|-
| moon
| giidj
|-
| fire
| damaia
|-
| smoke
| gunburau
|-
| water
| ŋogo
|}

Notes and references

Notes

References

Bernard Comrie. 2013. Numeral Bases. In: Dryer, Matthew S. & Haspelmath, Martin (eds.) The World Atlas of Language Structures Online. Leipzig: Max Planck Institute for Evolutionary Anthropology. (Available online at http://wals.info/chapter/131, Accessed on 2017-04-27.) 
 Jessie Garalnganyjak Roberts et al., 2011, Mangarrayi and Yangman plants and animals : Aboriginal biocultural knowledge from Elsey and the Roper River, north Australia, Darwin : Dept. of Natural Resources, Environment, the Arts and Sport : Diwurruwurru-Jaru Aboriginal Corp./Mimi Aboriginal Art & Craft
 Merlan, F., 1982, Mangarayi, Lingua Descriptive Series, vol. 4, Amsterdam

Mangarrayi–Maran languages
Northern Territory